National Socialist Movement may refer to:
 Nazi Party, a political movement in Germany
 National Socialist Movement (UK, 1962), a British neo-Nazi group
 National Socialist Movement (United Kingdom), a British neo-Nazi group active during the late 1990s
 National Socialist Movement (United States), a neo-Nazi organization based in Detroit, Michigan
 National Socialist Movement in the Netherlands, a Dutch fascist and later national socialist political party
 National Socialist Movement of Chile, a political movement in Chile
 National Socialist Movement of Denmark, a neo-Nazi political party in Denmark
 National Socialist Movement of Norway, a Norwegian neo-Nazi group

See also 
 American Nazi Party
 National Socialist Party (disambiguation)